Sara Errani (born 29 April 1987) is an Italian professional tennis player. She is a former top five player in singles and former world No. 1 in doubles. With 9 singles titles and 27 doubles titles (including 5 Grand Slam doubles championships and 5 Premier Mandatory/Premier doubles titles), she is the Italian tennis player with the highest number of WTA titles. She entered the Top 10 in doubles on 11 June 2012, remaining there for 94 straight weeks, and she reached her career-high singles ranking of world No. 5 on 20 May 2013. Errani became the world No. 1 in doubles for the first time on 10 September 2012. She was the year-end No. 1 doubles player in both 2013 and 2014, and has held the top ranking for a combined total of 87 weeks.

Errani's breakthrough season occurred in 2012. At the Australian Open, she reached the quarterfinals in singles (the first time she advanced past the third round in a Grand Slam singles draw) and was a finalist in doubles. Known as a clay-court specialist, Errani won three titles on clay going into the 2012 French Open, where she reached the finals in both the singles (becoming only the second Italian woman to ever reach a Grand Slam singles final) and doubles tournaments, winning the doubles title with her partner Roberta Vinci. They also won the doubles titles at the 2012 US Open, and the 2013 and 2014 Australian Open. By winning the 2014 Wimbledon Women's Doubles title, Errani and Vinci became only the fifth pair in tennis history to complete a Career Grand Slam.

Her achievement in reaching the 2012 US Open singles semifinals leaves Wimbledon as the only Grand Slam tournament in which Errani has yet to make the quarterfinals in singles. She also made the semifinals at the 2013 French Open, the quarterfinals at the 2014 French Open, 2014 US Open, and 2015 French Open, and qualified to the WTA Finals twice in 2012 and 2013. In 2017, Errani was banned from playing for 10 months due to a failed drug test.

Career

Early life and junior career
Errani was born in Bologna, Emilia-Romagna, Italy to Giorgio, a fruit and vegetable seller and Fulvia, a pharmacist. At the age of 12, her father sent her to the Nick Bollettieri Tennis Academy in Florida. At 16, she moved to Valencia, Spain to be coached by Pablo Lozano and David Andres.

Errani competed in her first event at the $10,000 Cagliari event in her native Italy in 2002, where she lost to Sun Tiantian. She continued to compete in the ITF, where her best performance of the year was a semifinal appearance in Zaton. She continued to participate mainly on the ITF circuit, where she won her first tournament over Lucia Jiminez in Melilla, Spain in 2005.

2008–2011

The first WTA title of her career was in the Internazionali Femminili di Palermo, where she defeated Mariya Koryttseva. On 27 July 2008, she captured her second career title in two weeks, defeating Anabel Medina Garrigues. She has also won six doubles WTA titles.

In 2009, Errani was the runner-up at two WTA tournaments, in Palermo and Portorož, as the defending champion in both. Errani was defeated in the first round of the French Open by defending champion Ana Ivanovic, whom she beat in the third round three years later.

Errani reached the third round in every Grand Slam except the French Open in 2010, where she lost in the first round.

Errani was a member of Fed Cup-winning Italian team in 2009 and 2010. In February 2011, she reached the finals of the PTT Pattaya Open, where she was defeated by Daniela Hantuchová.

2012: Breakthrough, French Open singles final, World No. 1 in doubles
At the beginning of 2012, Errani decided to change her racquet, switching from Wilson to Babolat, opting for a heavier and slightly longer model than the last, allowing for more power and better reach. This change caused her to return her $30,000 endorsement fee to Wilson. However, she and several commentators cite the new racquet as a reason for her improved game and her entry into the top 10 of the WTA rankings. In the first five months of 2012, she won three singles titles, earning over $1.3 million in prize money. Errani dubbed her new racquet "Excalibur", named after the sword of King Arthur.

At the Australian Open Errani advanced to her first Grand Slam quarterfinals, defeating Valeria Savinykh, Nadia Petrova, Sorana Cîrstea, and Zheng Jie en route, before losing to Petra Kvitová. Her ranking jumped to world No. 33. At the Abierto Monterrey Open, she was the second seed and reached the semifinals, losing to eventual champion Tímea Babos, but she triumphed on the clay in Acapulco as the third seed, winning her third career title. She defeated fellow Italians Roberta Vinci, and second seed Flavia Pennetta in her last two matches.

As the seventh seed at the Barcelona Ladies Open, Errani stormed to her fourth career title and second of the year, not dropping a set, beating second seeded Julia Görges in the quarterfinals, Carla Suárez Navarro in the semifinals, and Dominika Cibulková in the finals. Afterwards, her ranking rose to world No. 28. In the Fed Cup semifinals against the Czech Republic, Errani lost to Petra Kvitová, but beat Andrea Hlaváčková, with Italy losing the tie. On 7 May, Errani won the Budapest Grand Prix, tying country woman Roberta Vinci for the most titles won by an Italian female in a year at three.

Her performance continued to improve when she reached the finals of the French Open. En route she defeated Casey Dellacqua, Melanie Oudin, and former French Open winners Ana Ivanovic and Svetlana Kuznetsova. She secured a place in the semifinals by eliminating the German tenth seed Angelique Kerber, her first win over a current top-10 player. In the semifinals, she overcame the reigning US Open champion and 2010 French Open finalist Samantha Stosur to reach her first Grand Slam singles final opposite Maria Sharapova. Errani lost in the final. Her progress in this tournament helped her achieve the No. 10 ranking.

In addition to her singles wins, Errani also won six doubles titles with Roberta Vinci including the Madrid Open, the Internazionali BNL d'Italia, and the French Open. She and Vinci also made the finals of the Sony Ericsson Open and the Australian Open.

At Wimbledon, Errani lost in the third round to Yaroslava Shvedova, suffering the loss of the first, and to date only, Golden Set (i.e. a set in which every point is won by the same player) in a major in the women's tennis open era, and second ever recorded. In July, at the Italiacom Open, Errani, without losing a set, won her fourth title of the year, the sixth in her career. She defeated the Czech Barbora Záhlavová-Strýcová (seeded eighth) in the final. Errani then lost in the first round of the singles competition at the 2012 Summer Olympics in London, as well as the first round of the mixed doubles (with Andreas Seppi). However, she and Vinci reached the quarterfinals of the women's doubles.

She played the New Haven Open as the fourth seed. She reached the semifinals by beating fifth seed Marion Bartoli. She lost in the semifinals to Petra Kvitová. At the US Open, Errani had a slow start by beating Garbiñe Muguruza in three sets. However, she easily defeated  the Russians Vera Dushevina and Olga Puchkova. She lost only three games in these two rounds. In the fourth round, she defeated sixth seed, Angelique Kerber. In the quarterfinals, she defeated her doubles partner Vinci to come into the semifinals, where she lost in straight sets to eventual champion Serena Williams. With this result, she was the first Italian woman in the Open Era to reach the semifinals of the US Open, and the first Italian woman ever to come at least into semifinals of two different majors.

Errani and Vinci won the US Open women's doubles final. As of result, she reached the No. 1 spot on 10 September 2012.

At the end of the year she took part in the WTA Tour Championships for the first time in her career, either in single and double.

She has been the fifth tennis player in the world - on current format - to qualify either in single and double, after Svetlana Kuznetsova in 2003, Kim Clijsters in 2004 and the Williams sisters in 2009. 

In single, she was defeated in straight sets by Maria Sharapova, but she beat Samantha Stosur in the following match; she lost to fourth seed Agnieszka Radwańska in a match lasting three hours and 29 minutes (the longest best-of-three-set match in WTA Championships history).  She finished her breakthrough year as No. 6 in the world.

2013: Continued success, Top 5 singles ranking,  World No. 1 year-end doubles ranking

Errani was the seventh seed at the Australian Open, where she had reached the quarterfinals in 2012. However, she was defeated by Carla Suárez Navarro in the first round. In the doubles tournament, Errani, partnering with Vinci, won her third Grand Slam title, beating Australian wildcards Ashleigh Barty and Casey Dellacqua in the final.

She reached the finals of the Open GDF Suez in Paris, losing to Mona Barthel.
At the Qatar Ladies Open, she won her third doubles title of the year, with Vinci, beating Petrova and Srebotnik in the final. One week later, she reached the semifinals of the Dubai Tennis Championship, beating Nadia Petrova in three sets. Here, she defeated her doubles partner Roberta Vinci, reaching her second singles final of the year where she lost to Petra Kvitová in three sets. At the Abierto Mexicano Telcel, Errani reached her third final of the year (the second in a row) facing Carla Suárez Navarro. She won the final in two sets, her seventh singles title.

At the Mutua Madrid Open, where, defeating Urszula Radwańska, Sorana Cîrstea, Varvara Lepchenko, and Ekaterina Makarova, she reached the semifinals, her first in a WTA Premier Mandatory, where she was beaten by Serena Williams in straight sets. She reached the semifinals at Internazionali BNL d'Italia, where she was defeated by Victoria Azarenka.

As fifth seed, she played at French Open and lost in the semifinals to Serena Williams. In doubles, with Roberta Vinci, she reached her fifth Grand Slam final, losing to the Russian team of Ekaterina Makarova and Elena Vesnina. The followingmonth, she reached the finals in Palermo, where she was defeated by Roberta Vinci.

She qualified for the Tour Championships for the second consecutive time, either in single and double.

No one in the world - on current format - made it before, qualifying for single and double for two years in a row.

2014: First WTA Premier 1000 singles final, Career Grand Slam in doubles and World No. 1 year-end ranking

Errani competed in the Sydney International, where she reached the quarterfinals in singles, and was a finalist in doubles with Roberta Vinci, losing to Tímea Babos and Lucie Šafářová. At the Australian Open, she and Vinci defended their title, defeating first-time Australian Open finalists Ekaterina Makarova and Elena Vesnina in three sets to claim their fourth Grand Slam title. The following week, she lost in the finals at the Open GDF Suez in Paris to Anastasia Pavlyuchenkova in three sets.

At the Miami, she lost in the third round to Ekaterina Makarova, and because of the loss to the Russian in Miami, she left the top 10 rankings after 94 weeks from June 2012.

She reached the semifinals at Porsche Tennis Grand Prix in Stuttgart, and she won the doubles title, partnering with Roberta Vinci, after beating Cara Black and Sania Mirza; they also won their next doubles tournament was Mutua Madrid Open.

At the Internazionali BNL d'Italia, she upset world No. 2 Li Na in three sets for the first time in her career, after losing the previous six meetings and beating a top 3 player for the first time in her career; she reached the finals, after beating in straight sets world No. 8 and former world No. 1 Jelena Janković, then was defeated by Serena Williams.

As the tenth seed, she played at French Open, reaching her third straight quarterfinals. In the doubles, she played alongside Roberta Vinci; they reached their third consecutive final, falling to Hsieh Su-wei and Peng Shuai in straight sets.

At the Wimbledon, Errani and Vinci won the tournament to complete a career Grand Slam. Upon reaching the final, Errani and Vinci reclaimed the number-one ranking in women's doubles after having relinquished the ranking in February to Peng Shuai.

Errani reached the quarterfinals the US Open, her sixth Grand Slam quarterfinal appearance.

She qualified, for the third consecutive year, for the Tour Championships in double.

2015-2016: Biggest WTA title in singles

As the top seed at the 2015 Rio Open, Errani advanced to the finals and beat sixth seed Anna Karolína Schmiedlová 7–6, 6–1. This was Errani's first WTA singles title in two years. Seeded second at the Monterrey Open, Errani reached the semifinals by beating Lauren Davis, qualifier Tímea Babos, and fifth seed Anastasia Pavlyuchenkova. In the semifinals, she was defeated by fourth seed and eventual champion Timea Bacsinszky 6–0, 4–6, 7–6. Around this time, she suspended the doubles partnership with Roberta Vinci, preferring to dedicate herself to her singles career.

At the Dubai Tennis Championships in 2016, Errani reached the finals and defeated Barbora Strýcová 6–0, 6–2 to earn the biggest singles title of her career. 

After several losses in early rounds throughout 2016, Errani ended the year ranked 50.

2017-2018: Drugs test failure and suspension

After contending with injuries during the early part of the year, Errani had a solid result by reaching the semifinals at the Grand Prix SAR La Princesse Lalla Meryem. 

On 7 August 2017, it was announced that Sara Errani would be suspended for two months due to failing a doping test in February 2017, testing positive for the prohibited substance Letrozole. Errani claimed that she likely ingested letrozole by "accidentally consuming her mother's anti-cancer medication Femara" in home-made tortellini while visiting family. As a result, she was suspended for two months, with the ban ending 2 October. All Errani's results from the date of her positive out-of-competition test on 16 February until a negative test on 7 June were annulled, and all ranking points and prize money accrued in this period were forfeited. Both Errani and Italian anti-doping agency Nado Italia appealed sections of the suspension to the Court of Arbitration for Sport (CAS). Nado Italia sought a longer suspension time frame, where as Errani sought to have the disqualification of her results overturned. On 11 June 2018, the CAS ruled that Errani's suspension period should be lengthened to 10 months and that the disqualification of her results should stand. In 2012, Errani had already faced questions about her involvement with doping doctor Luis Garcia del Moral.

2020-21: Back to Majors & win over Venus Williams, first WTA 1000 doubles semifinal in 6 years
Upon returning to Grand Slam tennis Errani was knocked out of the 2020 Australian Open at the first hurdle in the qualifying rounds by Russian Anna Kalinskaya. In the 2020 French Open she fared better by reaching the second round. After the match, which Errani lost, it was reported she shouted abuse at opponent Kiki Bertens who was being taken off the court in a wheelchair due to injury.

Errani qualified for and reached the third round of the 2021 Australian Open, her best showing in 4 years as she did not participate in the main draw since 2017 and have not reached the third round since 2015. She beat Venus Williams in the second round but was defeated by Hsieh Su-wei.

At the 2021 Italian Open, Errani reached the semifinals in doubles with Irina-Camelia Begu where they were defeated by Mladenovic/Vondrousova. This was her first participation in a WTA 1000 in 2 years and first semifinal at this tournament in 8 years since reaching the final in 2015, as a result she jumped up by 200 spots in the rankings and reentered the top 200 in the doubles rankings.

2022-23: Back to Top 100 since 2018
In March, following her ITF title win in Arcadia, California, she returned to the top 100 at world No. 97 in the singles rankings on 6 March 2023 for the first time in more then 4 years since October 2018.

Tennis records
She is the only tennis player to have:

 Participated in, with current formula, the WTA Finals in singles and doubles for 2 years in a row (2012/2013).

 Reached the final in singles and doubles at Roland Garros in the same year (2012), same as Mary Pierce (2000), Kim Cljisters (2003) and Barbora Krejčíková (2021).

National record
She is the only Italian tennis player:

 remaining in Top 10 for 94 consecutive weeks

 having won 4 WTA Tournaments in a single season (2012) Acapulco, Barcelona, Budapest and Palermo.

 having closed the season in Top 10 for two years in a row (2012/2013).

 having played 3 Grand Slam semifinals.

 having played single and double finals at Internazionali d'Italia in the same year (2014).

 having played 63 WTA finals in career, between singles and doubles.

 having won at least one WTA title (single or double) for 11 years in a row.

 having completed (partnering R.Vinci) the Grand Slam Career in double.

She is also holding record of appearances in the National Team (Fed Cup, now Billie Jean King Cup), with 47 matches played - between single and double - and 26 victories.

Playing style
During the 2012 season, and for a few years after, Errani became known for producing a high first-serve percentage, being no.1 on the year-end statistics. Having won multiple titles on clay, she is widely recognized as a clay-court specialist and is known for her use of strategy on the surface, including her tendency to position herself well and to return serves early. Being a doubles specialist as well, she is noted for her speed around the court and for hitting the ball with a lot of spin, as well as for her deep and loopy groundstrokes.

The main weakness of Errani's game is the serve. She uses an abbreviated motion and with a small stature, combined with a shoulder problem, she is unable to hit fast serves, despite the precision.

Career statistics

Grand Slam performance timelines

Singles

Doubles

Grand Slam tournament finals

Singles: 1 (1 runner–up)

Doubles: 8 (5 titles, 3 runner–ups)

See also
 Tennis in Italy

References

External links

 

1987 births
Living people
Australian Open (tennis) champions
Doping cases in tennis
French Open champions
Grand Slam (tennis) champions in women's doubles
Italian expatriate sportspeople in Spain
Italian female tennis players
Italian sportspeople in doping cases
Olympic tennis players of Italy
Sportspeople from Bologna
Tennis players at the 2008 Summer Olympics
Tennis players at the 2012 Summer Olympics
Tennis players at the 2016 Summer Olympics
US Open (tennis) champions
Wimbledon champions
Tennis players at the 2020 Summer Olympics
WTA number 1 ranked doubles tennis players
ITF World Champions